Faraj is a name of Arabic origins, found in many locations including in Kuwait, Yemen, Egypt, Libya, United Arab Emirates, Azerbaijan, Iran, and others. The name derived from Arabic meaning "joy after sadness", and can also hold the meaning "to cure", "fortune", or "remedy". Historically the name was used to warding off evil spirits, such in the case when a sibling or parent has died. 

There are many variations on this name and its spelling due to language transfer issues between old Spanish, Modern Spanish, and Arabic. During the Middle Ages, the name Abu al-Faraj was a title for many Arab and Jewish poets and scholars.

Notable people with the name Faraj include:


Mononym or honorific 
 Abu Said Faraj, a Nasrid prince of Granada, d. 1320
 an-Nasir Faraj, Burji Mamluk Sultan of Egypt, 1399–1405
 Faraj ben Salim, Sicilian-Jewish physician and translator

Given name 
 Faraj Abbo (1921–1984), Iraqi artist, theatre director, designer, author and educator
 Faraj Al-Ghashayan (born 2000), Saudi Arabian professional footballer
 Faraj Al-Mass (born 1961), Qatari footballer
 Faraj Garayev (born 1943), Azerbaijani composer, music instructor, professor
 Faraj Said Bin Ghanem, Yemeni politician
 Faraj Guliyev (born 1962), Azerbaijani politician
 Faraj Jumaa (born 1993), Emirati footballer
 Faraj Laheeb, Kuwaiti footballer
 Farajollah Salahshoor, Iranian film director
 Faraj Sarkohi, Iranian literary critic

Middle name 
 Baba Faraj Tabrizi, Iranian Sufi shaykh ("master") of the 12th century
 Hamdi Faraj Fanoush, Libyan judge
 Mirza Faraj Rzayev, Azerbaijani musician, tar player
 Mohamed Faraj Al-Kaabi, Qatari athlete

Surname 
 Ahmad Faraj (born 1966), Emirati swimmer
 Abdullah Faraj (born 1986), Emirati footballer
 Imad Faraj (born 1999), French footballer
 Jumah Faraj (born 1985), Qatari volleyball player
 Mustafa Faraj, Kurdish military, member of the Peshmerga
 Omar Faraj (born 2002), Swedish professional footballer
 Salih Faraj, Iraqi basketball player
 Samy Faraj (born 2001), French professional footballer who plays as a midfielder)
 Saoud Faraj (born 1991), Emirati footballer

Other uses 

 Bab al-Faraj, name of a city gate in Aleppo, Syria
 Cham Faraj, village in Iran
 Dibsi Faraj, archaeological site in Syria
 Du'a al-Faraj, a prayer
 Faraj Alahi, village in Iran
 Faraj Beygi, village in Iran
 Faraj Divan, village in Iran
 Gol Faraj, village in Iran

See also
Abu al-Faraj
Farag
Farrag
Farage (surname)

References 

Arabic masculine given names
Iranian masculine given names
Jewish masculine given names
Azerbaijani masculine given names